Jollas is a genus of jumping spiders (Salticidae), found in Central America, the Caribbean and South America.

Species
, the World Spider Catalog accepted the following species:

 Jollas amazonicus Galiano, 1991 – Brazil
 Jollas armatus (Bryant, 1943) – Hispaniola
 Jollas crassus (Bryant, 1943) – Hispaniola
 Jollas cupreus Maddison, 2020 – Ecuador
 Jollas geniculatus Simon, 1901 – Panama, Trinidad, Colombia, Venezuela, Guyana
 Jollas hawkeswoodi Makhan, 2007 – Suriname
 Jollas manantiales Galiano, 1991 – Argentina
 Jollas minutus (Petrunkevitch, 1930) – Puerto Rico
 Jollas paranacito Galiano, 1991 – Argentina
 Jollas pompatus (Peckham & Peckham, 1893) – Panama, St. Vincent
 Jollas puntalara Galiano, 1991 – Argentina
 Jollas richardwellsi Makhan, 2009 – Suriname

Jollas lahorensis (Dyal, 1935), said to be from Pakistan, is regarded as a doubtful name (nomen dubium).

References

External links
 

Salticidae
Salticidae genera
Spiders of the Caribbean
Arthropods of the Dominican Republic
Spiders of Central America
Spiders of South America